Johanna Hyöty (born 15 February 1992) is a Finnish tennis player.

On 29 October 2012, Hyöty reached her best singles ranking of world number 893. On 22 October 2012, she peaked at number 763 in the WTA doubles rankings.

Hyöty was born in Tampere, and has a 1–3 record for Finland in Fed Cup competition.

On 7 November 2016, she joined up-and-coming accounting firm Squar Milner LLP, in the Los Angeles, CA office.

Collegiate career
In 2016, as a senior at Boston University, Hyöty was named the Patriot League Player of the Year.

ITF finals

Doubles (0–1)

Fed Cup participation

Singles

Doubles

References

External links
 
 
 

1992 births
Living people
Sportspeople from Tampere
Finnish female tennis players
Boston University alumni
Boston University Terriers women's tennis players
20th-century Finnish women
21st-century Finnish women